Sidney Schacht (February 3, 1918 – March 30, 1991) was an American professional baseball player. Born in Bogota, New Jersey, he was Jewish. He was a right-handed pitcher who appeared in 19 games in the Major Leagues for the St. Louis Browns (1950–1951) and Boston Braves (1951). He was not related to Al Schacht, the former pitcher and coach known as "the Clown Prince of Baseball."

Baseball career
Schacht did not begin his professional baseball career until 1947, when he was 29 years old.  He signed with the minor league Stamford Bombers of the Class B Colonial League.  Then living in The Bronx and caring for his ailing mother, Schacht commuted 25 miles (40 km) one-way to pitch for the Bombers, and won 18 of 25 decisions with a sparkling 2.94 earned run average.  The following year, Schacht dropped his ERA to 2.09, although he went only 7–8.  His contract was then acquired by the Boston Red Sox, where in 1949 he compiled a 20–5 record in a season split between the Class A Eastern League and the Double-A Southern Association–19 of those victories coming in the EL for the Scranton Red Sox. At year's end, he was selected by the Browns in the 1949 Rule 5 draft.

He made the Browns' roster out of spring training and worked in eight big-league games during the  season's early months.  His only starting pitcher assignment came May 29 against another second-division club, the Chicago White Sox, and Schacht retired only two batters, allowing three hits, two bases on balls and four earned runs.  He also was hit hard in relief appearances by the eventual world champion New York Yankees and first-division Red Sox.  Schacht was then optioned to the Triple-A Kansas City Blues, where he pitched effectively despite a losing record.

In , he again began the year on the Browns' 28-man roster, and earned his only MLB save on April 29 against the Cleveland Indians. However, Schacht was ineffective in three of his five appearances. He was placed on waivers when the rosters were cut to 25 men in mid-May and picked up by the National League Boston Braves. In six games for Boston during May and June, all in relief, Schacht allowed only one earned run, but earned two losses and then was optioned to the Triple-A Milwaukee Brewers. He went 4–1 for the minor-league Brewers, but retired from the game at age 33, after five professional seasons.  In 21⅓ innings pitched in Major League Baseball, Schacht allowed 44 hits, 21 bases on balls (compiling a WHIP of 3.047) and 34 earned runs, with 12 strikeouts and an earned run average of 14.34.

He died at age 73 in Fort Lauderdale, Florida.

References

External links

1918 births
1991 deaths
Baseball players from New Jersey
Birmingham Barons players
Boston Braves players
Jewish American baseball players
Jewish Major League Baseball players
Kansas City Blues (baseball) players
Major League Baseball pitchers
Milwaukee Brewers (minor league) players
People from Bogota, New Jersey
St. Louis Browns players
Scranton Red Sox players
Sportspeople from Bergen County, New Jersey
Baseball players from New York City
20th-century American Jews
Stamford Pioneers players